In mathematics, Hilbert's Nullstellensatz (German for "theorem of zeros," or more literally, "zero-locus-theorem") is a theorem that establishes a fundamental relationship between geometry and algebra. This relationship is the basis of algebraic geometry. It relates algebraic sets to ideals in polynomial rings over algebraically closed fields. This relationship was discovered by David Hilbert, who proved the Nullstellensatz in his second major paper on invariant theory in 1893 (following his seminal 1890 paper in which he proved Hilbert's basis theorem).

Formulation 
Let k be a field (such as the rational numbers) and K be an algebraically closed field extension (such as the complex numbers). Consider the polynomial ring  and let I be an ideal in this ring. The algebraic set V(I) defined by this ideal consists of all n-tuples x = (x1,...,xn) in Kn such that f(x) = 0 for all f in I. Hilbert's Nullstellensatz states that if p is some polynomial in  that vanishes on the algebraic set V(I), i.e. p(x) = 0 for all x in V(I), then there exists a natural number r such that pr is in I.

An immediate corollary is the weak Nullstellensatz: The ideal  contains 1 if and only if the polynomials in I do not have any common zeros in Kn. It may also be formulated as follows: if I is a proper ideal in  then V(I) cannot be empty, i.e. there exists a common zero for all the polynomials in the ideal in every algebraically closed extension of k. This is the reason for the name of the theorem, which can be proved easily from the 'weak' form using the Rabinowitsch trick. The assumption of considering common zeros in an algebraically closed field is essential here; for example, the elements of the proper ideal (X2 + 1) in  do not have a common zero in 

With the notation common in algebraic geometry, the Nullstellensatz can also be formulated as

for every ideal J. Here,  denotes the radical of J and I(U) is the ideal of all polynomials that vanish on the set U.

In this way, taking  we obtain an order-reversing bijective correspondence between the algebraic sets in Kn and the radical ideals of  In fact, more generally, one has a Galois connection between subsets of the space and subsets of the algebra, where "Zariski closure" and "radical of the ideal generated" are the closure operators.

As a particular example, consider a point . Then . More generally,

As another example, an algebraic subset W in Kn is irreducible (in the Zariski topology) if and only if  is a prime ideal.

Proofs 
There are many known proofs of the theorem. Some are non-constructive, such as the first one.

Using Zariski's lemma

Here is a sketch of a proof using this lemma.

Clearly, . Let . By Zariski's lemma,  is a finite extension of k; thus, is k since k is algebraically closed. Let  be the images of  under the natural map  passing through .

Using resultants
The following constructive proof of the weak form is one of the oldest proofs (the strong form results from the Rabinowitsch trick, which is also constructive).

The proof is as follows.

In the case of several polynomials  a linear change of variables  allows to suppose that  is monic in the first variable . Then, one introduces  new variables  and one considers the resultant

This proves the weak Nullstellensatz by induction on the number of variables.

Using Gröbner bases 

A Gröbner basis is an algorithmic concept that was introduced in 1973 by Bruno Buchberger. It is presently fundamental in computational geometry. A Gröbner basis is a special generating set of an ideal from which most properties of the ideal can easily be extracted. Those that are related to the Nullstellensatz are the following:
The number of the common zeros of the polynomials in a Gröbner basis is strongly related to the number of monomials that are irreducibles by the basis. Namely, the number of common zeros is infinite if and only if the same is true for the irreducible monomials; if the two numbers are finite, the number of irreducible monomials equals the numbers of zeros (in an algebraically closed field), counted with multiplicities.
With a lexicographic monomial order, the common zeros can be computed by solving iteratively univariate polynomials (this is not used in practice since one knows better algorithms).
Thus, the strong Nullstellensatz results almost immediately from the definition of the saturation.

Generalizations 
The Nullstellensatz is subsumed by a systematic development of the theory of Jacobson rings, which are those rings in which every radical ideal is an intersection of maximal ideals. Note that given Zariski's lemma, proving the Nullstellensatz amounts to showing that if k is a field, then every finitely generated k-algebra R (necessarily of the form ) is Jacobson. More generally, one has the following theorem:

 Let  be a Jacobson ring. If  is a finitely generated R-algebra, then  is a Jacobson ring.

Other generalizations proceed from viewing the Nullstellensatz in scheme-theoretic terms as saying that for any field k and nonzero finitely generated k-algebra R, the morphism  admits a section étale-locally (equivalently, after base change along  for some finite field extension ). In this vein, one has the following theorem:
Any faithfully flat morphism of schemes  locally of finite presentation admits a quasi-section, in the sense that there exists a faithfully flat and locally quasi-finite morphism  locally of finite presentation such that the base change  of  along  admits a section. Moreover, if  is quasi-compact (resp. quasi-compact and quasi-separated), then one may take  to be affine (resp.  affine and  quasi-finite), and if  is smooth surjective, then one may take  to be étale.
Serge Lang gave an extension of the Nullstellensatz to the case of infinitely many generators:

Then for any set  of cardinality , the polynomial ring  satisfies the Nullstellensatz, i.e., for any ideal  we have that .

Effective Nullstellensatz 
This means the existence or the non-existence of polynomials  such that .

To solve this problem, it suffices to provide an upper bound on the total degree of the : such a bound reduces the problem to a finite system of linear equations that may be solved by usual linear algebra techniques. Any such upper bound is called an effective Nullstellensatz.

A related problem is the ideal membership problem, which consists in testing if a polynomial belongs to an ideal. A general solution of the ideal membership problem provides an effective Nullstellensatz, at least for the weak form.

In 1925, Grete Hermann gave an upper bound for ideal membership problem that is doubly exponential in the number of variables. In 1982 Mayr and Meyer gave an example where the  have a degree that is at least double exponential, showing that every general upper bound for the ideal membership problem is doubly exponential in the number of variables.  

Since most mathematicians at the time assumed the effective Nullstellensatz was at least as hard as ideal membership, few mathematicians sought a bound better than double-exponential.  In 1987, however, W. Dale Brownawell gave an upper bound for the effective Nullstellensatz that is simply exponential in the number of variables.  Brownawell's proof relied on analytic techniques valid only in characteristic 0, but, one year later, János Kollár gave a purely algebraic proof, valid in any characteristic, of a slightly better bound.

In the case of the weak Nullstellensatz, Kollár's bound is the following:

Let  be polynomials in  variables, of total degree . If there exist polynomials  such that , then they can be chosen such that 
 
This bound is optimal if all the degrees are greater than 2.

Kollár's result has been improved by several authors. , the best improvement, due to M. Sombra is

His bound improves Kollár's as soon as at least two of the degrees that are involved are lower than 3.

Projective Nullstellensatz
We can formulate a certain correspondence between homogeneous ideals of polynomials and algebraic subsets of a projective space, called the projective Nullstellensatz, that is analogous to the affine one. To do that, we introduce some notations. Let  The homogeneous ideal, 

 

is called the maximal homogeneous ideal (see also irrelevant ideal). As in the affine case, we let: for a subset  and a homogeneous ideal I of R,

By  we mean: for every homogeneous coordinates  of a point of S we have . This implies that the homogeneous components of f are also zero on S and thus that  is a homogeneous ideal. Equivalently,  is the homogeneous ideal generated by homogeneous polynomials f that vanish on S. Now, for any homogeneous ideal , by the usual Nullstellensatz, we have:

and so, like in the affine case, we have:

Analytic Nullstellensatz (Rückert’s Nullstellensatz)
The Nullstellensatz also holds for the germs of holomorphic functions at a point of complex n-space  Precisely, for each open subset  let  denote the ring of holomorphic functions on U; then  is a sheaf on  The stalk  at, say, the origin can be shown to be a Noetherian local ring that is a unique factorization domain.

If  is a germ represented by a holomorphic function , then let  be the equivalence class of the set 

where two subsets  are considered equivalent if  for some neighborhood U of 0. Note  is independent of a choice of the representative  For each ideal  let  denote  for some generators  of I. It is well-defined; i.e., is independent of a choice of the generators.

For each subset , let 

The analytic Nullstellensatz then states: for each ideal ,

where the left-hand side is the radical of I.

See also
Stengle's Positivstellensatz
Differential Nullstellensatz
Combinatorial Nullstellensatz
Artin–Tate lemma
Real radical
Restricted power series#Tate algebra, an analog of Hilbert's nullstellensatz holds for Tate algebras.

Notes

References
 

 

 

Polynomials
Theorems in algebraic geometry